Austin Lake is a lake located in Kalamazoo County in the U.S. state of Michigan.
A boat launch is provided with a (U.S.) $6 daily fee. All watercraft are allowed. No alcoholic beverages are allowed.

See also
List of lakes in Michigan

References

Lakes of Kalamazoo County, Michigan
Lakes of Michigan